National Bank of Flint was a bank headquartered in Flint, Michigan. In 1942, it was acquired by Michigan National Bank.

History
The bank was founded on January 30, 1934 to free up the impounded deposits of Union Industrial Bank and First National Bank of Flint, which were both closed under the Emergency Banking Act of 1933 after they suffered from bank failure.

The bank's offices were in the former Union Industrial Bank Building which is now the Mott Foundation Building, named after Charles Stewart Mott.

On May 1, 1942, the bank was acquired by Michigan National Bank. The local bank operation evolved into branches of the Huntington National Bank.

References

1934 establishments in Michigan
Banks established in 1934
Banks disestablished in 1942
1942 disestablishments in Michigan
Defunct banks of the United States
Companies based in Flint, Michigan